John Galt Solutions is a software company that provides forecasting and supply chain management software.

Overview
John Galt Solutions is a privately held software company that provides forecasting and supply chain planning for mid-market companies.

Founded in 1996 and headquartered in Chicago, they claim more than 6,000 customers worldwide use John Galt Solutions products every day.

History
John Galt Solutions was founded in 1996 by Annemarie Omrod. The company is named after the iconic figure in Ayn Rand's novel Atlas Shrugged, John Galt. John Galt Solutions' initial projects involved building data warehouses for utility companies. In 1997, John Galt Solutions built its forecasting tool the ForecastX Wizard. In December 1998, ForecastX competed in the M3 Forecasting Competition, an academic forecasting accuracy competition sponsored by INSEAD (the European Institute of Business Administration), finishing in the top two positions in all categories.

In conjunction with Holt Wilson (Central Michigan University) and Barry Keating (Notre Dame University), John Galt Solutions published Business Forecasting (6th Edition). This textbook, on forecasting methods and the practical issues related to forecasting, is used in over 60 universities.

Founder Annemarie Omrod has contributed to several academic journals including the Harvard Business Review and quoted in the MIT Center for Transportation & Logistics newsletter 

The company has strategic partnerships with PeopleSoft, Oracle, Infor and QAD.

References

Supply chain software companies
Companies based in Chicago
Software companies based in Illinois
Software companies of the United States
1996 establishments in Illinois
Software companies established in 1996
American companies established in 1996